Neonerita pulchra is a moth of the family Erebidae. It was described by Hervé de Toulgoët in 1983. It is found in Panama.

References

 

Phaegopterina
Moths described in 1983